The Ingrians, sometimes called Ingrian Finns, are the Finnish population of Ingria (now the central part of Leningrad Oblast in Russia), descending from Lutheran Finnish immigrants introduced into the area in the 17th century, when Finland and Ingria were both parts of the Swedish Empire. In the forced deportations before and after World War II, and during the genocide of Ingrian Finns, most of them were relocated to other parts of the Soviet Union, or killed. Today the Ingrian Finns constitute the largest part of the Finnish population of the Russian Federation. According to some records, some 25,000 Ingrian Finns have returned or still reside in the region of Saint Petersburg.

History

Origins
Finnish-speaking Ingrians are not to be confused with Izhorian-speaking Ingrians. Ingrian Finns mainly consist of two groups: Savakot, who originated from migrant Savonians; and Äyrämöiset, coming from the Karelian Isthmus (mostly from Äyräpää), then parts of the Swedish realm. They were Lutheran settlers and migrant workers who moved to Ingria during the period of Swedish rule 1617–1703. Others originated from more or less voluntary conversion among the indigenous Finnic-speaking Votes and Izhorians, where approved by the Swedish authorities. Finns made up 41.1 percent of the population of Ingria in 1656, 53.2 percent in 1661, 55.2 percent in 1666, 56.9 percent in 1671 and 73.8 percent in 1695.

After the Russian conquest and the foundation of Saint Petersburg (1703), the flow of migration was reversed. Russian nobles were granted land in Ingria, and Lutheran Ingrian Finns left Ingria, where they were in minority, for the area known as Old Finland, north of the Gulf of Finland, which Russia had gained from Sweden during the 18th century, and where Lutherans were a large majority. There the Ingrian Finns assimilated with the Karelian Finns.

Developments in the 19th century
In 1870, the printing of the first Finnish-language newspaper, Pietarin Sanomat, started in Ingria. Before that Ingria received newspapers mostly from Vyborg. The first public library was opened in 1850, in Tyrö. The largest of the libraries, situated in Skuoritsa, had more than 2,000 volumes in the second half of the 19th century. In 1899, the first song festival in Ingria was held in Puutosti (Skuoritsa).

By 1897, the number of Ingrian Finns had grown to 130,413, and by 1917 it exceeded 140,000 (45,000 in Northern Ingria, 52,000 in Central (Eastern) Ingria and 30,000 in Western Ingria, the rest in Petrograd).

Ingrians in the Soviet Union

After the 1917 Bolshevik revolution, Ingrian Finns inhabiting the southern part of the Karelian Isthmus seceded from Soviet Russia and formed the independent Republic of North Ingria, which was backed by Finland. The short-lived republic was reintegrated with Soviet Russia according to the 14 October 1920 Russian-Finnish Treaty of Tartu, and for several years thereafter it retained some degree of autonomy. From 1928 to 1939, Ingrian Finns in North Ingria constituted the Kuivaisi National District with its center in Toksova and Finnish as its official language.

The First All-Union Census of the Soviet Union in 1926 recorded 114,831 "Leningrad
Finns", as Ingrian Finns were then called.

Soviet rule, and the German occupation (1941–1944) during World War II, were as disastrous for the Ingrian Finns as for other small ethnic groups. Many Ingrian Finns were either executed, deported to Siberia, or forced to relocate to other parts of the Soviet Union. There were also refugees to Finland, where they assimilated.

In 1928, collectivization of agriculture started in Ingria. To facilitate it, in 1929–1931, 18,000 people (4,320 families) from North Ingria were deported to East Karelia or the Kola Peninsula, as well as to Kazakhstan and other parts of Central Asia. The situation for the Ingrian Finns deteriorated further because of the Soviet plan to create restricted security zones along the borders with Finland and Estonia, free of the Finnic peoples, who were considered politically unreliable. In April 1935 7,000 people (2,000 families) were deported from Ingria to Kazakhstan, elsewhere in Central Asia, and the Ural region. In May and June 1936 20,000 people, the entire Finnish population of the parishes of Valkeasaari, Lempaala, Vuole and Miikkulainen near the Finnish border, were transferred to the area around Cherepovets. In Ingria they were replaced by people from other parts of the Soviet Union.

In 1937 Lutheran churches and Finnish-language schools in Ingria were closed down, and publications and radio broadcasting in Finnish were suspended.

In March 1939 the Kuivaisi National District was liquidated.

Initially during the Winter War, the Soviet policy was mixed. On the one hand, Stalin's government largely destroyed Ingrian Finnish culture, but on the other hand, the maintenance of a Finnish-speaking population was desired as a way to legitimize the planned occupation of Finland. The failure of the puppet Terijoki government led to the ultimate result that in 1941, Moscow officially decided that Ingrian Finns were unreliable, and in 1942 most of the Ingrian Finns remaining in Ingria were forcibly relocated to Siberia. During the Finnish and German occupation of the area, Ingrian Finns were evacuated to Finland. However, after the Continuation War, most of these Ingrian Finns, who were still Soviet citizens, were forcibly returned to the Soviet Union, where they were dispersed into Central Russia. However, some Ingrian Finns were able to flee to Sweden, and nearly 4,000 were able to remain in Finland. Ingrian Finns were largely forgotten during the presidencies of Juho Kusti Paasikivi and Urho Kekkonen.

After the war many Ingrian Finns settled in Soviet-controlled Estonia.

Present day
From the dissolution of the Soviet Union in 1991 until 2010, about 25,000 Ingrian Finns moved from Russia and Estonia to Finland, where they were eligible for automatic residence permits under the Finnish Law of Return. In 2010, however, the Finnish government decided to stop the remigration, so Ingrian Finns seeking residence are now treated in the same way as any other foreigners. There are still about 15,000 people in the remigration queue.

The number of people who declared their nationality as Finnish in the 2010 Russian census was 20,000, down from 47,000 in 1989.

Many Ingrian Finns, including mixed families, who moved to Finland did not speak any language other than Russian and in many cases still identify as Russians.
There are social integration problems similar to those of any other migrant group in Europe, to such an extent that there is a political debate in Finland over the retention of the Finnish Law of Return. In contrast, native Finnish-speakers have been easily assimilated into mainstream Finnish culture, leaving little trace of Ingrian Finnish traditions.

In Estonia, the Ingrian Finns enjoy a cultural autonomy since 2004, being the first minority to organize and use such a right after Estonia's restoration of independence. The 2011 census counted 369 Ingrian Finns in Estonia, a large majority of whom are also citizens of Estonia.

In Russia, many Ingrian Finns are members of the Evangelical Lutheran Church of Ingria.

Notable people of Ingrian Finnish descent

See also
Kola Norwegians
Karelians
Tornedalians
Skogfinner
Sweden Finns
Finland-Swedes
Kvens
Murmansk Finns

References 

Ingria
Ethnic groups in Russia
Ethnic groups in Finland
Baltic Finns
Social history of Finland
Finland under Swedish rule
Ethnic groups in Estonia
Finland–Soviet Union relations
Finnish diaspora